Pyrrhus (Greek: Πύρρος, ? – 1 June 654) was the ecumenical patriarch of Constantinople from 20 December 638 to 29 September 641, and again from 9 January to 1 June 654.

He was a supporter of Monotheletism, a christological doctrine propounded by the Emperor Heraclius. In 638, with the support of Heraclius, he was elected to the patriarchal throne. In the unrest following the death of Heraclius, he was accused of plotting against the life of Emperor Constantine III with Empress Martina to favor her son, Heraklonas. The army and the populace rose in revolt and the powerful Valentinus deposed and banished Pyrrhus to Africa. Soon after, Martina and Heraklonas were also deposed and exiled; Constans II, Constantine's son, was proclaimed the sole emperor.

While in exile, in 645 he conducted with Maximus the Confessor a public discussion on faith (Disputatio cum Pyrrho), after which he rejected Monothelitism, and visited Rome in 647. From there he continued to Ravenna and returned to Constantinople, where he again reversed his position and re-embraced Monothelitism. He was excommunicated by Pope Theodore I as a consequence, but succeeded in becoming again patriarch in early 654, holding the office until his death on 1 June of the same year.

He was posthumously cast out as heretical by the Third Council of Constantinople in 680/1.

Sources

External links 
 

654 deaths
7th-century patriarchs of Constantinople
People declared heretics by the first seven ecumenical councils
Year of birth unknown